The Chota Nagpur Tributary States or Chota Nagpur States were a group of non-salute states (minor princely states) at the time of British Raj, located on the Chhota Nagpur Plateau. British suzerainty over the states was exercised through the government of the Bengal Presidency.

These states were nine in number and they became part of the Indian states of Madhya Pradesh, Bihar and Odisha following Indian Independence.

History 
In the 18th century, the states came within the sphere of influence of the Maratha Empire, but they became tributary states of British India as a result of the Anglo-Maratha Wars in the early 19th century.

In October 1905, the exercise of British influence over the predominantly Hindi-speaking states of Chang Bhakar, Jashpur, Koriya, Surguja, and Udaipur was transferred from the Bengal government to that of the Central Provinces, while the two Oriya-speaking state Gangpur and Bonai were attached to the Orissa Tributary States, leaving only Kharsawan and Saraikela answerable to the Bengal governor.

In 1936, all nine states were transferred to the Eastern States Agency, the officials of which came under the direct authority of the Governor-General of India, rather than under that of any Provinces.

After Indian independence in 1947, the rulers of the states all chose to accede to the Dominion of India. Changbhakar, Jashpur, Koriya, Surguja and Udaipur later became part of Madhya Pradesh state, but Gangpur and Bonai part of Orissa state, and Kharsawan and Saraikela part of Bihar state.

In November 2000, the new states of Chhattisgarh and Jharkhand were separated from Madhya Pradesh and Bihar, respectively.

Princely States 
The following princely states were collectively called 'Chhota Nagpur Tributary States' : 
 Orissa States Agency (together with the Orissa Tributary States) :
Bonai
Gangpur
Kharsawan
Saraikela
 Chhattisgarh States Agency : 
Changbhakar
Jashpur
Koriya (Korea)
Surguja (Sarguja)
Udaipur (Dharamjaigarh) (not to be confused with the  Mewar state Udaipur, in Rajasthan)

See also 
 Chota Nagpur Division
 Eastern States Union
 Orissa Tributary States

References 

Princely states of India
History of Jharkhand
History of Odisha
History of Chhattisgarh
1821 establishments in India
1947 disestablishments in India